is a Japanese film director.

Filmography
Odoru Daisosasen Bangaihen – Wangansho Fukei Monogatari Shoka no Kôtsûanzen Special (1998)
Bayside Shakedown: The Movie (1998)
Space Travelers (2000)
Satorare (2001)
Bayside Shakedown 2 (2003)
Summer Time Machine Blues (2005)
Shaolin Girl (2008)
Bayside Shakedown 3 (2010)
Psycho-Pass (2012)
Bayside Shakedown The Final (2012)
Psycho-Pass: The Movie (2015)
Maku ga Agaru (2015)
Ajin: Demi-Human (2017)
Laughing Under the Clouds (2018)
FLCL Progressive (2018)
FLCL Alternative (2018)
Human Lost (2019)
Beautiful Dreamer (2020)
Brave: Gunjō Senki (2021)

References

External links

1965 births
Japanese film directors
Living people
People from Kagawa Prefecture